FAT Brands is an American multi-brand restaurant operator headquartered in Beverly Hills, California.

History 
FAT Brands began as a holding company for Fatburger in 2017, gaining a chairman in Ed Rensi. On August 13, 2020, Johnny Rockets was acquired by FAT Brands for $25 million.

In July 2021, FAT purchased Global Franchise Group, now owning Round Table Pizza, Hot Dog on a Stick, Great American Cookies, Pretzelmaker and Marble Slab Creamery. On September 1, 2021, FAT Brands announced that it would acquire Twin Peaks, for $300 million. The acquisition was completed on October 1.

In May 2022, it was announced FAT Brands had acquired the franchised chain, Nestlé Toll House Café for an undisclosed sum, and plans to convert all 86 locations to Great American Cookies locations.

Brands
As of May 2022, FAT Brands own the following chains:

 Buffalo's Café
 Elevation Burger
 Fatburger
 Fazoli's
 Great American Cookies
 Hot Dog on a Stick
 Hurricane Grill & Wings
 Johnny Rockets
 Marble Slab Creamery
 Native Grill & Wings
 Ponderosa and Bonanza Steakhouses
 Pretzelmaker
 Round Table Pizza
 Twin Peaks
 Yalla Mediterranean

References

External links
 Official website

Companies based in Beverly Hills, California
Restaurant groups in the United States
Restaurants established in 2017
American companies established in 2017
Companies listed on the Nasdaq
2017 establishments in California